La Clandestine Absinthe is a Swiss La Bleue, or clear, absinthe brand produced by Artemisia-Bugnon distilleries.  It is an anise-flavored, distilled liquor containing the herb wormwood (Artemisia absinthium), and when prepared with cold water will louche. La Clandestine Absinthe comes in four main styles, as detailed below.

La Clandestine Absinthe
According to the manufacturer, La Clandestine is based on a 1935 recipe by Swiss distiller Charlotte Vaucher  which Bugnon had been circulating unofficially for several years prior to the Swiss lifting a near one-hundred-year ban on absinthe March 1, 2005.  Following the lift, Bugnon applied for an official license and became one of the first distillers in the Val-de-Travers region to be granted one. It is now commercially produced and sold by Artemisia-Bugnon. In June 2008, the US Alcohol and Tobacco Tax and Trade Bureau approved a version of La Clandestine for sale in the United States, and USA launch followed in October 2008.

La Clandestine, which is produced at 53% abv (alcohol by volume) is served in a manner similar to the traditional 19th-century French method, differing only in the use of sugar.  The manufacturer recommends that La Clandestine be served without sugar.

La Capricieuse
La Capricieuse, at 72% abv, was added in summer 2005.

La Recette Marianne
La Recette Marianne, at 55% abv, was launched in autumn 2005, in response to fenchone regulations in France.

Angélique

Angélique, at 72% abv, is the first Verte (or green) Suisse absinthe from the La Clandestine distillery, and was launched at the 10th Annual Absinthe Festival at Boveresse, Switzerland, in June 2007.

References

External links 
La Clandestine Absinthe - Brand website
Fée Verte Review - Independent website confirming that La Clandestine had been sold for "years" prior to its official launch.

Absinthes
Distilleries in Switzerland